Wilfrid Cyriaque (born 10 May 1951) is a Haitian sprinter. He competed in the men's 400 metres at the 1976 Summer Olympics.

References

1951 births
Living people
Athletes (track and field) at the 1975 Pan American Games
Athletes (track and field) at the 1976 Summer Olympics
Haitian male sprinters
Olympic athletes of Haiti
Place of birth missing (living people)
Pan American Games competitors for Haiti